Powers Creek is a stream in northeast Butler County in the U.S. state of Missouri. It is a tributary of the Black River.

Powers Creek was named after George Powers, an early settler.

See also
List of rivers of Missouri

References

Rivers of Butler County, Missouri
Rivers of Missouri
Tributaries of the Black River (Arkansas–Missouri)